The summer truffle (Tuber aestivum) or burgundy truffle (Tuber uncinatum) is a species of truffle, found in almost all European countries.

Taxonomy
In cuisine and commerce, particularly in France and Italy, the summer truffle (T. aestivum) is distinguished from the burgundy truffle (T. uncinatum). However, molecular analysis showed in 2004 that these two varieties of truffle are one species. The differences between them are therefore likely due to environmental factors.

This article uses the older of the two binomial names, T. aestivum, to designate the species, while discussing the characteristics of the two varieties separately.

Burgundy truffles
Burgundy truffles (or scorzone, "bark";), have a  hazelnut-like aroma and are prized for their gastronomic qualities. They are used in the haute cuisine of France and Italy, sometimes as a less expensive, milder substitute for the Périgord black truffle (T. melanosporum) when the latter are not available. Like other truffles, they are also packaged for export.

Burgundy truffles are harvested from September to late December, sometimes also until late January. They have a wider distribution than any other truffle species. Burgundy truffles are found across Europe, from Spain to eastern Europe and from Sweden to North Africa. In France they are found mainly in the north-east and in Italy, in the north. In the United Kingdom they were plentiful prior to the 20th century, but are now rare. Their distribution may not yet be definitively established: there are as of 2007 unconfirmed reports of findings in China.

Summer truffles
The flavor, size and color of summer truffles is similar to that of burgundy truffles, but their aroma is less intense and the flesh (gleba) is a paler hazel color.

As their name suggests, summer truffles are harvested earlier than burgundy truffles, from May to August. They are most often found in the southern part of the distribution area of the species, notably in the Mediterranean climate areas of France, Italy and Spain.

References

Footnotes

aestivum
Truffles (fungi)
Fungi described in 1831